The Kamor is a mountain in the Appenzell Alps and has an elevation of . It is part of a mountain belt which forms the western boundary of the Rhine Valley and is located on the border of the Swiss cantons Appenzell Innerrhoden and Canton of St. Gallen.

Less than one kilometre to the south is the Hoher Kasten, a 1,794 m high mountain accessible via an aerial tramway. Both mountains are separated by the Kamorsattel, a 1,678 m high saddle.

On top of the Kamor is a wooden summit cross erected by the section Kamor of the Swiss Alpine Club.

Ascents to Kamor and Hoher Kasten were already described in the early 19th century.

References

External links 
 
 Interactive panoramic view

Mountains of the Alps
Mountains of Switzerland
Mountains of Appenzell Innerrhoden
Mountains of the canton of St. Gallen
Appenzell Alps
One-thousanders of Switzerland
Appenzell Innerrhoden–St. Gallen border